The Karakoram Pass is a  mountain pass between India and China in the Karakoram Range.  It is the highest pass on the ancient caravan route between Leh in Ladakh and Yarkand in the Tarim Basin. 'Karakoram' literally means 'Black Gravel' in Mongolic.

Historically, the high altitude of the pass and the lack of fodder were responsible for the deaths of countless pack animals while the route was notorious for the trail of bones strewn along the way. There is an almost total absence of vegetation on the approaches to the pass.

To the north, the country was somewhat less desolate and involved travellers crossing the relatively easy and lower Suget Dawan (or Suget Pass)  before reaching the lush grazing grounds around Shahidullah or Xaidulla in the upper valley of the Karakash River.

There is no vegetation or icecap and it is generally free of snow due to the winds. Temperatures are low, there are often very high winds, blizzards are frequent, and the extreme altitude often took its toll. In spite of all this, the Karakoram Pass was considered a relatively easy pass due to the gradual ascent on both sides, and lack of summer snow and ice much of the year. Consequently, the pass was open throughout most of the year. There is no motorable road across the pass, and the pass currently remains closed to all traffic.

Geopolitical issues
The Karakoram pass falls on the boundary between India's union territory of Ladakh and China's Xinjiang autonomous region.

It also plays a major geographic role in the dispute between Pakistan and India over control of the Siachen Glacier area immediately to the southwest of the pass. This situation arose from the Simla Agreement, signed in 1972 between India and Pakistan, when the treaty failed to specify the last  or so of the cease-fire line from the end of the Line of Control to the border with China.

A potential China-India-Pakistan tripoint at Karakoram Pass is referenced in a 1963 boundary treaty between China and Pakistan concerning the Trans-Karakoram Tract, but India was not party to that treaty nor any tripoint agreement.  The entire Siachen Glacier, with all major passes and heights of the Saltoro Ridge (including Sia La, Bilafond La, Gyong La, Yarma La (6,100m), and Chulung La (5,800m).), has been under the administration of India (currently as part of the union territory of Ladakh) since 1984. The current de facto tripoint is about 100 km west of the pass near Indira Col in the Siachen Muztagh, where the Actual Ground Position Line between Indian and Pakistani forces meets the border with China.

Historical maps

See also
 Depsang Plains
 Daulat Beg Oldi
 List of mountain passes of India

Notes

References

Resources
 Schmidt, Jeremy. Himalayan Passage: Seven Months in the High country of Tibet, Nepal, China, India & Pakistan. 1991. The Mountaineers Books, Seattle.

Mountain passes of China
Mountain passes of Xinjiang
China–India border 
Mountain passes of India
Mountain passes of Ladakh
Borders of Ladakh
Mountain passes of the Karakoram